In biochemistry, a conformational change is a change in the shape of a macromolecule, often induced by environmental factors.

A macromolecule is usually flexible and dynamic. Its shape can change in response to changes in its environment or other factors; each possible shape is called a conformation, and a transition between them is called a conformational change. Factors that may induce such changes include temperature, pH, voltage, light in chromophores, concentration of ions, phosphorylation, or the binding of a ligand. Transitions between these states occur on a variety of length scales (tenths of Å to nm) and time scales (ns to s), 
and have been linked to functionally relevant phenomena such as allosteric signaling and enzyme catalysis.

Laboratory analysis 
Many biophysical techniques such as crystallography, NMR, electron paramagnetic resonance (EPR) using spin label techniques, circular dichroism (CD), hydrogen exchange, and FRET can be used to study macromolecular conformational change. Dual-polarization interferometry is a benchtop technique capable of providing information about conformational changes in biomolecules.

A specific nonlinear optical technique called second-harmonic generation (SHG) has been recently applied to the study of conformational change in proteins.  In this method, a second-harmonic-active probe is placed at a site that undergoes motion in the protein by mutagenesis or non-site-specific attachment, and the protein is adsorbed or specifically immobilized to a surface.  A change in protein conformation produces a change in the net orientation of the dye relative to the surface plane and therefore the intensity of the second harmonic beam.  In a protein sample with a well-defined orientation, the tilt angle of the probe can be quantitatively determined, in real space and real time.  Second-harmonic-active unnatural amino acids can also be used as probes.

Another method applies electro-switchable biosurfaces where proteins are placed on top of short DNA molecules which are then dragged through a buffer solution by application of alternating electrical potentials. By measuring their speed which ultimately depends on their hydrodynamic friction, conformational changes can be visualized.

"Nanoantennas" made out of DNA – a novel type of nano-scale optical antenna – can be attached to proteins and produce a signal via fluorescence for their distinct conformational changes.

Computational analysis 
X-ray crystallography can provide information about changes in conformation at the atomic level, but the expense and difficulty of such experiments make computational methods an attractive alternative. Normal mode analysis with elastic network models, such as the Gaussian network model, can be used to probe molecular dynamics trajectories as well as known structures. ProDy is a popular tool for such analysis.

Examples 

Conformational changes are important for:

 ABC transporters 
 catalysis
 cellular locomotion and motor proteins
 formation of protein complexes
 ion channels
 mechanoreceptors and mechanotransduction
 regulatory activity 
 transport of metabolites across cell membranes

See also 
Database of protein conformational diversity
Protein dynamics
The Database of Macromolecular Motions (molmovdb)

External links 
Frauenfelder, H. New looks at protein motions Nature 338, 623 - 624 (20 April 1989).
Sensing with electro-switchable biosurfaces

References 

Microbiology techniques